pH7 is an album by Peter Hammill, originally released on Charisma Records in September 1979. It was Hammill's eighth solo album and his last release on the Charisma label.

The song "Porton Down" refers to the Porton Down military research facility in Wiltshire, England, while the lyrics of "Imperial Walls" are a translation of the first few lines of the Anglo-Saxon poem "The Ruin".

The song "Not For Keith" is a tribute to Keith Ellis, a former member of the band Van der Graaf Generator, who had then died just recently.

"Cover note: The photographs were all taken late at night in NYC. As we left Dan's [the photographer's] place in search of a cab Graham [Smith] and I ran into some trouble from which, frankly, we were lucky to escape...".

"My Favourite" was re-worked for Hammill's 1984 album The Love Songs.

"Faculty X" is a reference to extrasensory perception in the books of Colin Wilson.

Track listing 
All tracks composed by Peter Hammill; except where noted.

In 2006, the album was remastered and expanded, adding alternative versions of "Mr X (Gets Tense)" and "Faculty X" recorded for John Peel's BBC Radio 1 programme, as well as a fresh sleeve note by Hammill.

US/Canada vinyl pressings have an additional track at the end of side A, "The Polaroid".

Personnel 
Peter Hammill – voice, guitar, keyboards, bass, drums, drum machine
Graham Smith – violin 
David Jackson – saxophone, flute

Technical
Peter Hammill - recording engineer (Sofa Sound, Wiltshire)
Pat Moran – mixing (Rockfield Studios, Monmouth)
Rocking Russian – artwork
Daniel C. Kirk – photography

References

External links 
Peter Hammill's notes on the album

Peter Hammill albums
1979 albums
Charisma Records albums